Pevek Airport  is a civilian airport located 15 km northeast of Pevek. It is located on the coast of East Siberian Sea and is one of the few airports in Russia on the polar route capable of handling aircraft as large as Boeing 767 and, in case of emergency, even larger planes.

It mainly services medium-sized airliners.  Its use for military operations is unknown but the runway and facilities are adequate for interceptor operations.  The airfield elevation is given either as 13 or 14 meters according to various Department of Defense navigation charts.

Airlines and destinations

The airport operates infrequent, usually weekly service to Moscow, as well as flights to regional airports. There are no scheduled flights on most days. Flights to Moscow are operated by a Boeing 757 and Boeing 767 and flights to Anadyr and Keperveyem by a Twin Otter, An-24 or helicopter.

Accidents and incidents 

 On 12 March 1963, a Li-2 registered CCCP-16202 crashed immediately after takeoff due to overloading. The aircraft was written off.
 On 14 August 2014, a Mi-8 helicopter registered RA-24738 collided with the terminal during taxiing, hitting the building with its rotor.

External links
 Pevek Airport contact info at zaworldairports.com
 Photo gallery of Pevek Airport

Airports built in the Soviet Union
Airports in Chukotka Autonomous Okrug
Airports in the Arctic